Bidaai is a 1974 Indian Hindi-language drama film, produced and directed by L. V. Prasad under the Prasad Productions Pvt Ltd banner. It stars Jeetendra and Leena Chandavarkar, with music composed by Laxmikant Pyarelal. The film was a remake of the Telugu film Thalla? Pellama? (1970). Durga Khote, who played the widowed mother of Jeetendra and Satyen Kapu, won the Filmfare Award for Best Supporting Actress.

Plot 
The film begins in a village where a wise woman Parvati raises her two sons Prabhakar & Sudhakar along with dumb daughter Gauri. Soon after getting a fine job, Prabhakar quits and neglects his family. However, Parvati stands strong and strives hard to educate Sudhakar. Years roll by, and Sudhakar joins the college where he falls for Padma daughter of a millionaire Seth Dharmdas. Parallelly, in an anecdote, Gauri loves a pure Murli which is opposed by his wicked cheapskate father Makhan Seth. As a result, Gauri commits suicide and Murli too follows her. Besides, Prabhakar a prodigal life in false prestige and also bribes which is turndown by his wife Pooja. The couple is blessed with a genuine boy Krishna who is morale. Meanwhile, Padma marries Sudhakar without her father’s acceptance. However, she is unable to acclimatize to poverty and her husband’s priority toward his mother. Hence, she separates Sudhakar from his mother which Parvati also insists on. Now, Sudhakar wants to teach the Padma a lesson, so, he forges as a gambler & drunkard. Simultaneously, Krishna learns about his grandmother and moves for her. By the time, Parvati is on her deathbed when heartfelt with joy to see her grandson and he serves her. As the clock runs Padma becomes pregnant and gives birth to a boy, but Sudhakar split the baby from the mother. Thus, Dharmdas files a case where Sudhakar proclaims it’s as a play to convey the true motherly affection when Padma pleads for pardon. At last, they move to Parvati including Prabhakar one who that bankrupts. Finally, the movie ends Parvati happily leaves her last breath in the hands of the children.

Cast 

 Jeetendra as Sudhakar
 Leena Chandavarkar as Padma Dharam Das
 Madan Puri as Dharam Das
 Durga Khote as Parvati
 Satyendra Kappu as Prabhakar
 Anwar Hussain as Magan
 Kanan Kaushal as Pooja
 Meena T. as Gauri
 Arpana Chodhury as Champa
 A. K. Hangal as Ramsharan
 Asrani as Murli/Bhaskar
 Satyajeet as Krishna
 Dinesh Hingoo as Ramu
 Birbal as Tirath Das
 Raj Varma as Bildichan
 Jayshree T. as Bhaskar's girlfriend
 Jagdeep as Shankar Lal
 Vikas Anand as Lawyer
 Pinchoo Kapoor as Judge

Soundtrack

Accolades

References

External links 
 

1974 films
Indian drama films
Hindi remakes of Telugu films
1970s Hindi-language films
Films directed by L. V. Prasad
Films scored by Laxmikant–Pyarelal
1974 drama films
Hindi-language drama films